Ian Malcolm Gundry-White,  (21 December 1918 – 15 September 1961) was a Royal Air Force officer of the Second World War and Cold War period, who served as the Chief of Air Staff of the Ghana Air Force from September 1960 to March 1961.

References

1918 births
1961 deaths
British World War II pilots
Chiefs of Air Staff (Ghana)
Ghana Air Force personnel
Recipients of the Commendation for Valuable Service in the Air
Recipients of the Distinguished Flying Cross (United Kingdom)
Royal Air Force officers
Royal Air Force personnel of World War II